Saint Mamertinus of Auxerre (d. ~462 AD) was a monk and abbot. He was converted by Germanus of Auxerre and became a monk at the Abbey of Saints Cosmas and Damian, Auxerre (later rededicated to Saint Marianus of Auxerre). He later served as its abbot.

External links
Saints of March 30: Mamertinus

Converts to Christianity from pagan religions
5th-century Christian saints
Gallo-Roman saints